Mighty Med is an American Disney XD original series created by Jim Bernstein and Andy Schwartz and produced by It's a Laugh Productions for Disney XD. It stars Bradley Steven Perry, Jake Short, Paris Berelc, Devan Leos, and Augie Isaac. The series aired for two seasons, premiering on October 7, 2013, and running through September 9, 2015.

Series overview

Episodes

Season 1 (2013–14)

Season 2 (2014–15)

References

Lists of American children's television series episodes
Lists of American comedy television series episodes
Lists of Disney Channel television series episodes